Illeis (Hibachi) bistigmosa, is a species of lady beetle native to India, and Sri Lanka.

Description
Eyes are large, and moderately faceted. The interval between the eyes as wide as an eye. Mandibles are bifid at apex and more coarsely dentate at inner margin.

Biology
It is a mycophagous coccinellid associated with powdery mildew in various crops such as mulberry where it feeds on the fungus, Phyllactinia corylea that causes powdery mildew of mulberry, and Erysiphe cichoracearum causing powdery mildew on sunflower.

References 

Coccinellidae
Insects of Sri Lanka
Beetles described in 1850